The Shaker-style pantry box is a round bentwood box made by hand.
Such boxes are "associated with Shaker folklife because they express the utility and uniformity valued in Shaker culture."

Description 

Shaker boxes were traditionally finished with milk paint made from milk casein, tinted with earth pigments. Milk paint is incredibly durable, lasting hundreds of years when used indoors.

Shakers cease actual production 
The concept continues to be meticulously honored by modern woodworkers, who are aware of the difficult process involved.

See also
Steam bending
Joseph Wolfinger, maker of round wooden cheese boxes.
Bentwood boxes.

References

Sources

   

Handicrafts
Containers
Crafts
Decorative arts
Food storage containers
Shaker inventions
18th-century inventions
19th-century inventions